Applied improvisation is the application of improvisational theatrical methods in various non-theatrical fields, including consulting, training, and teaching. It is known to be used as an experiential educational approach, one which enables participants to explore and improve their leadership, management and interpersonal capabilities in several fields, which include collaboration, communications, creativity, and team-building.

History 

Applied improvisation began in the late 1990s with the performative turn in social science. The increased focus on performance and improvisation led to the application of improvisational methods in non-theatrical fields. In 2002, the Applied Improvisation Network was founded, a non-profit organization of people committed to using applied improvisation.

Applied improvisation sees use in consulting and corporate training, particularly in the areas of sales and leadership. Applied improvisation is also often used in design thinking, service design, and UX design.

In addition to the business world, applied improvisation sees use in disaster readiness training, drama therapy, medicine, and education.

Further reading 
 Landgraf, Edgar. 2014. Improvisation as Art: Conceptual Challenges, Historical Perspectives. Bloomsbury Academic. 
 Sawyer, Keith. 2011. Structure and Improvisation in Creative Teaching. Cambridge University Press. 
 Schinko-Fischli, Susanne, 2018, Applied Improvisation for Coaches and Leaders: A Practical Guide for Creative Collaboration, Routledge. ISBN 9781138315266
 Dudeck, Theresa Robbins and McClure, Caitlin, 2018, Applied Improvisation: Leading, Collaborating, and Creating Beyond the Theatre, Methuen Drama. ISBN 9781350014367
 Dudeck, Theresa Robbins and McClure, Caitlin, 2021, The Applied Improvisation Mindset: Tools for Transforming Organizations and Communities, Methuen Drama. ISBN 978-1350143616

References

External links
Applied Improvisation Network
Medical improvisation literature

Training